Fimbristylis caespitosa, commonly known as fringe-rush, is a sedge of the family Cyperaceae that is native to northern parts of Australia.

It blooms between December and August and produces green-brown flowers.

The plants has a life span of between six and ten years and is able to produce seeds after two to three years. It can resprout basally from a lignotuber following fires.

In Western Australia it is found in and around swamps and claypans and on sandstone hills in the Kimberley and Pilbara regions where it grows in sandy soils. It is also found throughout the central of the Northern Territory between Alice Springs and Katherine and parts of Queensland.

References

Plants described in 1810
Flora of Western Australia
Flora of the Northern Territory
Flora of Queensland
caespitosa
Taxa named by Robert Brown (botanist, born 1773)